William Neill Culley (26 August 1892 – 9 November 1955), sometimes known as Willie Culley or Bill Culley, was a Scottish professional footballer, best remembered for his two spells as a forward in the Scottish League with Kilmarnock, for whom he made over 200 appearances. He also played in the Football League for Bristol Rovers and Swindon Town and represented the Scottish League XI. Later in his career, Culley served as reserve team manager at Kilmarnock.

Personal life 
Culley died in 1955 in Irvine, Scotland, after experiencing heart problems.

Honours 
Kilmarnock
 Scottish Cup: 1919–20
Individual

 Kilmarnock Hall of Fame

Career statistics

References

External links 

 Bill Culley at killiefc.com

1892 births
1955 deaths
Ardrossan Winton Rovers F.C. players
Association football forwards
Bristol Rovers F.C. players
Clyde F.C. players
English Football League players
Galston F.C. players
Kilmarnock F.C. non-playing staff
Kilmarnock F.C. players
Kilwinning Rangers F.C. players
People from Kilwinning
Renton F.C. players
Scottish Football League players
Scottish footballers
Swindon Town F.C. players
Third Lanark A.C. players
Western Football League players
Weymouth F.C. players
Scottish Football League representative players
Scottish Junior Football Association players
Footballers from North Ayrshire